Deeper Into Movies is a collection of 1969 to 1972 movie reviews by American film critic Pauline Kael, published by Little, Brown and Company in 1973. It was the fourth collection of her columns; these were originally published in The New Yorker. It won the U.S. National Book Award in category Arts and Letters.

Summary
Containing reviews of individual films from the aforementioned time period, the collection also includes a long essay entitled "Numbing the Audience".

Directors
In the anthology, Kael praises the merits of then up-and-coming directors Robert Altman and Francis Ford Coppola, in her reviews of MASH, McCabe & Mrs. Miller, and The Godfather.  She pans Stanley Kubrick and his A Clockwork Orange for its brutality and moral convolutions.

Print Status
The book is now out-of-print in the United States, but is still published in the United Kingdom by Marion Boyars Publishers, an independent publishing company.

Films reviewed

 Butch Cassidy and the Sundance Kid
 Bob & Carol & Ted & Alice
 Oh! What a Lovely War 
 The Bed Sitting Room
 A Walk with Love and Death
 de Sade
 High School
 The Royal Hunt of the Sun
 The Madwoman of Chaillot
 Paint Your Wagon
 Lions Love
 The Sterile Cuckoo
 The Secret of Santa Vittoria
 Duet for Cannibals
 Coming Apart
 Goodbye, Mr. Chips
 Adalen 31
 Hail, Hero!
 In the Year of the Pig
 Downhill Racer
 The Arrangement
 La Femme Infidèle
 All the Loving Couples
 Popcorn
 The Comic
 Z
 Alfred the Great
 They Shoot Horses, Don't They?
 John and Mary
 Gaily, Gaily
 The Reivers
 Tell Them Willie Boy Is Here
 Topaz
 Hello, Dolly!
 On Her Majesty's Secret Service
 Marooned
 The Damned
 Hamlet
 A Boy Named Charlie Brown
 M*A*S*H
 Anne of the Thousand Days
 Patton
 Hospital
 The Milky Way
 The Molly Maguires
 The Kremlin Letter
 The Honeymoon Killers
 A Married Couple
 End of the Road
 Zabriskie Point
 The Looking Glass War
 Loving
 The Only Game in Town
 Start the Revolution Without Me
 The Magic Christian
 Tropic of Cancer
 Fellini Satyricon
 The Adventurers
 Airport
 The Boys in the Band
 Women in Love
 Trash
 The Baby Maker
 The Great White Hope
 Monte Walsh
 First Love
 Ice
 I Never Sang for My Father
 Goin' Down the Road
 This Man Must Die
 Little Fauss and Big Halsy
 C.C. and Company
 Burn!
 The Twelve Chairs
 Cromwell
 WUSA The Owl and the Pussycat Where's Poppa? The Private Life of Sherlock Holmes Song of Norway Ryan's Daughter Perfect Friday The Pizza Triangle Bombay Talkie Scrooge Groupies I Walk the Line The Confession 
 The Act of the Heart Gimme Shelter Little Big Man Love Story Investigation of a Citizen Above Suspicion Husbands Alex in Wonderland Brewster McCloud There Was a Crooked Man... The Music Lovers Bed and Board Promise at Dawn The Last Valley Puzzle of a Downfall Child Little Murders The Hour of the Furnaces Doctors' Wives The Sporting Club The Garden of Delights Claire's Knee Wanda A New Leaf The Conformist The Andromeda Strain McCabe & Mrs. Miller Klute Carnal Knowledge The Anderson Tapes Sunday Bloody Sunday The Last Picture Show The Last Movie Skin Game The Trojan Women Murmur of the Heart The Début T.R. Baskin The French Connection Long Ago, Tomorrow Is There Sex After Death? Fiddler on the Roof El Topo Billy Jack Born to Win Going Home King Lear Man in the Wilderness Bedknobs and Broomsticks''

References

External links 
 Pauline Kael on A Clockwork Orange

1973 non-fiction books
Books of film criticism
Books about film
National Book Award-winning works
Little, Brown and Company books
Books by Pauline Kael
American non-fiction books